Andrej Stančík (born 1 June 1995 in Piešťany) is a slovak politician, who has been an MP of the  National Council since 2020. He is a member of the Ordinary People and Independent Personalities (OĽANO) movement caucus.

Early life 
Stančík studied International Relations at the Masaryk University, graduating in 2019. He is currently pursuing a PhD degree there.

Member of the parliament 
Stančík ran in the  2020 Slovak parliamentary election on the OĽANO list. He was elected to parliament. In October 2022 he joined the government as a State Secretary at the Ministry of Foreign and European Affairs and had to give up his MP seat as per the Slovak Constitution which prohibits government members to sit in the parliament for the duration of their membership in the government.

References

OĽaNO politicians
People from Piešťany
Living people
1995 births
Masaryk University alumni
Members of the National Council (Slovakia) 2020-present